Anthony Wayne Smith (born June 20, 1967) is a former American football defensive end in the National Football League and convicted murderer. He was drafted by the Raiders 11th overall in the 1990 NFL Draft. He played college football at Arizona and also Alabama.

NFL career
Following Smith's third season, he signed a four-year contract extension with the Raiders for $7.6 million. In 1997, he opted out of his contract and left the NFL.

2003 firebombing charge
In 2003, Smith was charged with firebombing a Santa Monica, California, furniture store, "reportedly over a dispute with the store's owner about money and a consignment item." After two juries were unable to reach a verdict in the case, a judge dismissed the charge.

Murders, trials and convictions
In March 2011, Smith and two others were charged with the 2008 murder of Maurilio Ponce, who was beaten and shot in October 2008 in Lancaster, California, with his body being dumped "near the Antelope Valley poppy fields some 11 miles away." Prosecutors said that the murder of Ponce, a mechanic, occurred after "a business deal gone wrong."

In April 2011, the jury deadlocked in the case with a vote of 8-4 in favor of guilt. In July 2012, while awaiting retrial, Smith was additionally charged with three other killings: the 1999 murders of brothers Kevin and Ricky Nettles, who were kidnapped from a Los Angeles car wash before being shot and their bodies dumped, and the kidnapping and fatal stabbing of Dennis Henderson in Los Angeles in June 2011. On October 12, 2012, after a preliminary hearing, a Los Angeles County judge found sufficient evidence for Smith to stand trial for the four murders. According to testimony at trial, Smith impersonated a police detective while abducting the Nettles, who were subsequently tortured before being murdered.

On November 5, 2015, after the trial and eight days of jury deliberations, Smith was convicted of the murders of Ricky and Kevin Nettles and Henderson. The jury also found special circumstance — "that Smith committed kidnapping, torture and multiple murders." The jury deadlocked on the count of the murder of Ponce, with a 9-3 split in favor of guilty verdict.

On January 22, 2016, Smith was sentenced to three consecutive life sentences, without the possibility of parole.

Personal life
Smith has been married three times. His second wife was former singer–actress Denise Matthews, better known as Vanity. The marriage lasted for a year, from 1995 to 1996. In 1997, Smith was arrested for domestic violence involving another woman and sentenced to anger-management classes. In 1997, he met his current wife Teresa Obello White.

References

1967 births
Alabama Crimson Tide football players
American football defensive ends
American people convicted of murder
American serial killers
American sportspeople convicted of crimes
Arizona Wildcats football players
Criminals from North Carolina
Living people
Los Angeles Raiders players
Male serial killers
Oakland Raiders players
People convicted of murder by California
People from Elizabeth City, North Carolina
Players of American football from North Carolina
Prisoners sentenced to life imprisonment by California
Sportspeople convicted of murder